Nina Obuljen-Koržinek (born 27 May 1970) is a Croatian violinist and political scientist serving as Minister of Culture and Media since 2016.

Early life and education 
Nina Obuljen Koržinek was born in 1970 in Dubrovnik, in the family of Nikola Ćićo Obuljen who served as mayor of Dubrovnik from 1993 until 1997. After finishing elementary and high school in her hometown she enrolled in the University of Zagreb's Academy of Music, from which she graduated violin, and Faculty of Humanities and Social Sciences, from which she graduated French language and comparative literature. Since 2013, she holds PhD in political science from the Faculty of Political Science of the University of Zagreb where she defended her doctoral thesis "Impact of international integration processes on the changes of scope of national cultural policies". In addition, she graduated from the Diplomatic Academy of the Ministry of Foreign Affairs of Croatia.

See also 
Cabinet of Andrej Plenković
Cabinet of Andrej Plenković II
Nina Valjalo

References 

1970 births
Living people
People from Dubrovnik
Faculty of Humanities and Social Sciences, University of Zagreb alumni
Women government ministers of Croatia
Culture ministers of Croatia
21st-century Croatian women politicians
21st-century Croatian politicians